The IMSAI 8080 was an early microcomputer released in late 1975, based on the Intel 8080 and later 8085 and S-100 bus. It was a clone of its main competitor, the earlier MITS Altair 8800. The IMSAI is largely regarded as the first "clone" microcomputer. The IMSAI machine ran a highly modified version of the CP/M operating system called IMDOS. It was developed, manufactured and sold by IMS Associates, Inc. (later renamed IMSAI Manufacturing Corp). In total, between 17,000 and 20,000 units were produced from 1975 to 1978.

History 

In May 1972, William Millard started a business called IMS Associates (IMS) in the areas of computer consulting and engineering, using his home as an office. By 1973, Millard incorporated the business and soon found funding for it, receiving several contracts, all for software.

In 1974, IMS was contacted by a client which wanted a "workstation system" that could complete jobs for any General Motors car dealership. IMS planned a system including a terminal, small computer, printer, and special software. Five of these workstations were to have common access to a hard disk drive, which would be controlled by a small computer. Eventually product development was stopped.

Millard and his chief engineer Joe Killian turned to the microprocessor. Intel had announced the 8080 chip, and compared to the 4004 to which IMS Associates had been first introduced, it looked like a "real computer". Full-scale development of the IMSAI 8080 was put into action using the existing Altair 8800's S-100 bus, and by October 1975 an ad was placed in Popular Electronics, receiving positive reactions.

IMS shipped the first IMSAI 8080 kits on 16 December 1975, before turning to fully assembled units. In 1976, IMS was renamed to IMSAI Manufacturing Corporation because by then, they were a manufacturing company, not a consulting firm.

In 1977, IMSAI marketing director Seymour I. Rubinstein paid Gary Kildall $25,000 for the right to run CP/M version 1.3, which eventually evolved into an operating system called IMDOS, on IMSAI 8080 computers. Other manufacturers followed and CP/M eventually became the de facto standard 8-bit operating system.

By October 1979, the IMSAI corporation was bankrupt. The VDP (all-in-one) computer had sold poorly and was not competitive with the Radio Shack TRS-80, Commodore PET, and Apple II computers. The 'IMSAI' trademark was acquired by Thomas "Todd" Fischer and Nancy Freitas (former early employees of IMS Associates), who continued manufacturing the computers under the IMSAI name as a division of Fischer-Freitas Co. Support for early IMSAI systems continues.

IMSAI 8080 replicas have entered the market, due in part to the legality of hardware copyright encouraging amateur techophiles to make backwards compatible machines, with the retro aesthetics. The color scheme matches the original IMS 1973 "Hypercube" project, but some peripherals such as the floppy are simulated and instead use Wi-fi.

VDP series 
In mid-1977, IMSAI released the VDP-series, based on the Intel 8085. According to the product description of January 1978, many different models were released, with 32K or 64K memory and a 9" (VDP4x-range) or 12" (VDP8x-range) video display. For example, the VDP-40 had two 5-1/4" disk drives, a 9" 40-character-wide display and a 2K ROM monitor all in one cabinet. The built-in keyboard had a 8035 microprocessor and a serial interface to the main board. The VIO-C video board had 2K firmware ROM, 2K character generator read-only memory (ROM) with 256 characters and 2K of refresh memory.

In popular culture
An IMSAI 8080 and an acoustic coupler type modem were among the hacking tools used by the main character in the 1983 movie WarGames.

The 2011 novel Ready Player One by Ernest Cline features an IMSAI 8080 at the end, being the place where Wade "Parzival" Watts finds the easter egg that will grant control of the OASIS virtual reality to its finder.

Further reading 
 THE HISTORY OF IMSAI: The Path to Excellence, produced 1978

References

External links

 Distributor of IMSAI parts, docs and the Series Two model www.imsai.net
 Short description of the IMSAI 8080 with photos oldcomputers.net
 The History of the IMSAI 8080 www.pc-history.org
 IMSAI 8080 www.old-computers.com
 IMSAI 8080 oldcomputermuseum.com
 IMSAI 8080 Replica Kit thehighnibble.com
 Marcus Bennett's IMSAI
 "War Games" IMSAI 8080 - Computerphile, YouTube, 28 March 2018

Early microcomputers
Personal computers
S-100 machines
8-bit computers
Computer-related introductions in 1975